The General Dynamics Griffin is a series of armored fighting vehicles under development by General Dynamics Land Systems (GDLS) for the United States Army. The Griffin is a derivative of ASCOD family of AFVs, which was also designed by GDLS.

Platform

Griffin - Technology Demonstrator (TD) 
At AUSA 2016 annual meeting, General Dynamics unveiled 120mm Griffin Technology Demonstrator (TD) as a "conversation starter" for the US Army Mobile Protected Firepower (MPF) program. MPF is a light tracked vehicle intended to provide support of large caliber direct fire for Infantry Brigade Combat Team. The chassis of Griffin I shown at AUSA is from British Scout SV program (now called Ajax), but it only has six road wheels. The welded aluminum turret is armed with 120mm XM360 lightweight gun which was developed by the Army Research, Development and Engineering Center. The XM360 gun was developed as part of the canceled Future Combat Systems (FCS) program.

Griffin II 

Griffin II is offered under Army's Mobile Protected Firepower (MPF). In accordance with the program's caliber requirements, it incorporated a 105mm caliber M35 gun and a redesigned chassis. The M35 was originally designed and developed by Benét Laboratories, Watervliet Arsenal in 1983 for the Marine Corps' Mobile Protected Gun Program. It was later incorporated in the Army's M8 Armored Gun System light tank, which was canceled in 1996. The M35 is about  lighter than the M68 used on the M60 tank.
In December 2018, GDLS was downselected, along with BAE Systems, to develop prototypes. GDLS presented its first prototype in April 2020. BAE's M8 AGS proposal was disqualified in March 2022.

In June 2022, GDLS won the Mobile Protected Firepower program competition and was awarded a contract worth up to $1.14 billion.

Griffin III 
Griffin III was first unveiled at the Association of the United States Army's 2018 Exposition in Huntsville, Alabama. It was being offered under Army's Optionally Manned Fighting Vehicle (OMFV) program with six fully equipped infantry carrying option in the back. This version, while similar in weight to Griffin II, scaled down the main gun from 105mm caliber to the 50 mm XM913 gun system. It is equipped with the IMI Systems’ Iron Fist Active Protection System (APS) and AeroVironment’s Switchblade loitering munition system.

Selection

The Army selected the GDLS Griffin II light tank as the winner of its Mobile Protected Firepower program in June 2022. The initial contract is for 96 low-rate initial production (LRIP) vehicles, with first delivery by the end of 2023.

See also 
 M8 Armored Gun System
 M1128 Mobile Gun System
 Optionally Manned Fighting Vehicle

References 

Experimental military vehicles
General Dynamics land vehicles
Tracked armoured fighting vehicles
Tracked infantry fighting vehicles
Light tanks of the United States
Post–Cold War light tanks